Loch Na Fooey, also Loch Nafooey or Lough Nafooey, is a rectangular shaped glacial lake in County Galway, Ireland. Part of the north-eastern shore lies along the border to County Mayo. The closest village is Finny, County Mayo with the Galway village of Leenaun approximately 11 km distant.

At approximately 2.5 miles long and 0.5 miles wide, Loch Na Fooey is set in a steep-sided valley, surrounded by the mountains of Galway to the south and Mayo's Partry Mountains to the north. A number of rivers feed the lake, including the River Fooey, which rises from the Devil’s Mother mountain and enters the lake at the western shore. The Finny River, rising from the south-east of the lake drains into the southwest part of Lough Mask. Also many mountain streams flow into the lake. The lake has a small sandy shore on its western end.

The area around Loch Na Fooey is known as the site of the ancient "Finny volcano" (490 million years ago), formed as the Iapetus Ocean closed to bring the two halves of Ireland together. The volcano's landform is now gone but some of volcanic rocks are preserved in the area, including pillow lavas, and breccia.

There is a small funnel-shaped island close to the south-eastern shore known as Red Island (An tOileán Rua).

The waters hold a range of fish including wild brown trout and pike.

The locality has a number of walks, both for experienced hill walkers and others. In folklore, the lake is said to be home to An Capall Uisce or the Water Horse, a mythical Celtic creature.

See also
List of loughs in Ireland
List of volcanoes in the Republic of Ireland

References

Fooey
Volcanoes of the Republic of Ireland
Cambrian volcanoes
Subduction volcanoes
Extinct volcanoes
Fooey
Gaeltacht places in County Galway